The Astoria Fan is a submarine fan. It has sediment, radiating asymmetrically southward from the mouth of the Astoria Canyon.

Astoria Fan is generally asymmetrical. Others trace different dimensions.

Headed west, the fan crosses the continental shelf, trending sinuously down to the base of the continental slope. It has numerous tributaries.

Ash from the eruption of Mount Mazama has been found, in Astoria Fan.  It may have been cut in the Pleistocene. It appears the Missoula Floods helped carve the fan.

In the past, buried Pleistocene channels appear to have connected the two.

Nearby submarine canyons

All of the following submarine canyons are near, headed north to south:

 Clayoquot Canyon
 Father Charles Canyon
 Loudon Canyon
 Barkely Canyon
 Nitinat Canyon
 Juan de Fuca Canyon
 Quileute Canyon
 Quinault Canyon
 Grays Canyon
 Guide Canyon
 Willapa Canyon
 Astoria Canyon

See also

 Astoria Canyon

Local geography

 Abyssal fan
 Astoria Canyon
 Astoria Fan
 Cascadia Basin
 Cascadia Channel
 Cascadia Subduction Zone
 Grays Canyon
 Juan de Fuca Canyon
 Juan de Fuca Plate
 Juan de Fuca Channel
 Nitinat Canyon
 Nitinat Fan
 Quinault Canyon
 Quileute Canyon
 Willapa Canyon

References

External links and references

 A map
 A scientific article
 Article, from Oregon State University
 Springer-Verlang article
 A NOAA article
 A doctoral thesis on Astoria Fan
 Some geographic information
 One youtube

Pacific Ocean
Marine geology
Geology of the Pacific Ocean